Colin McAlpin (9 April 1870 – 13 May 1942) was an English composer of songs, operas and ballet music, an organist and a writer of critical essays on music.

Life

Colin McAlpin was born in 1870, at 15 Gallowtree Gate, Leicester, England. He was the fourth child of a clothier John William McAlpin, and his German wife Marie Louise (née Gerdes). His elder siblings were Kenneth, Donal and Janet, and his younger brothers Alan and John.

McAlpin published his first composition when he was only 15 and at Wellingborough School: a song called The Cuckoo published in the Midland Musical Journal. At the age of 16 he was admitted to the Royal Academy of Music to study harmony with Francis William Davenport and organ playing with Charles Steggall, and after three years he acquired silver medals in both areas of study. In 1892 Robin Hood, his first dramatic work, was performed at Wellingborough School and that year he was appointed organist and choirmaster at Kensington Presbyterian Church.

In 1897, King Arthur, an opera in three acts, commissioned by impresario Herbert Marshall, was performed by the Leicester Philharmonic Society under H. S. Ellis. In that year three of McAlpin's Ten Songs were performed in one of Granville Bantock's concerts for British composers. The Ten Songs were published by Cary & Son, the first of dozens of his pieces to be published by this company. In his thirtieth year McAlpin was appointed organist and choirmaster of Trinity Presbyterian Church Clapham, where his sacred cantata The Prince of Peace had its first performance. He was in 1920 appointed organist and choirmaster of Ealing Presbyterian Church, and in that year his cantata Excalibur was performed in London.

In 1903 King Arthur was performed at the Royalty Theatre, London. In the same year his opera in four acts, The Cross and the Crescent, first produced at Covent Garden by the Moody-Manners company, won him the Manners Prize of £250 for the best opera by a British composer, and it was performed subsequently in Glasgow and Edinburgh. A one-act opera The Vow staged at the Theatre Royal, Nottingham won him the same prize twelve years later.

His writings included critical essays published in journals The Musical Times and The Musical Quarterly, and his book Hermaia: a Study in Comparative Esthetics, which his biographer David J. Fisher describes as "a remarkable study of comparative aesthetics", has been recognised as culturally important.

In 1907 McAlpin had his portrait painted by Richard Jack RA, and a bronze bust was sculpted by W. B. Fagan FRBS.

He married an artist Susette Peach (1871-1950) in 1899, and they had one son Roderic McAlpin (1907-1965).

Colin McAlpin died at Dorking, Surrey, on 13 May 1942.

Compositions

Operas

Robin Hood, an opera, written at school, about 1885
King Arthur, an opera in three acts, with words by the composer. Leipzig and London: Bosworth & Co., 1897. Premiere: Leicester Philharmonic Choir.
Fingal, an opera in four acts, with a cast of 9
The Cross and the Crescent, his prize-winning opera, produced by Charles Manners and first performed in 1903. Words from John Davidson's translation of Pour la Couronne, a tragedy by François Coppée.
The Vow, an opera in one act, libretto upon the Biblical story of Jephtha's daughter. Premiere in Nottingham, 1915, produced by Charles Manners.
Ingomar, an opera, performed at Theatre Royal, Drury Lane in 1910.

Cantatas
The Prince of Peace. Sacred cantata for chorus and organ, with soprano, tenor and bass soli. Cary & Co.: London First performance 17 December 1902 at Trinity Presbyterian Church, Clapham, London.
 Excalibur, in 2 Acts, for chorus SATB and orchestra. Unpublished. First performance 1920, produced by the Fairbairn Opera, at the Surrey Theatre.

Songs

Ode for the opening of Westminster College, Cambridge, 17 October 1899
 The Lad with the Bonnet of Blue (Alice C. MacDonell), London: Cary & Co., 1899 
 The Doom of Knocklea (Alice C. MacDonell), unpublished
 Our Heroe's welcome (Alice C. MacDonell), unpublished
 The Penitent (John Murray), London: Weekes & Co., 1902
 Like as a Father, Sacred Song, London: J. Williams, 1903
 Mary's Song: A Song of Bethlehem (Colin McAlpin), from The Prince of Peace, London: Cary & Co., 1903
 Ten Songs, London: Cary & Co., 1903 , also Whaley, Royce & Co. Winnipeg, Toronto (1905)
1. The light of love (Hartley Coleridge)
2. She walks in beauty (Byron)
3. Elegy: Oh! snatched away in beauty's bloom (Byron)
4. A faded violet (Shelley)
5. Slumber song (Colin McAlpin) - "sung by Miss Ada Crossley"
6. Music, when soft voices die (Shelley)
7. A widow-bird (Shelley)
8. Thou wouldst be loved (Edgar Allan Poe)
9. A lament (Shelley) - two stanzas
10. There be none of Beauty's daughters (Byron)
 Three Songs, London: Cary & Co., 1904 
 As of Yore
 Spring
 A Love Song
 Love's Vigil (W.W. Robinson), London: Boosey & Co., 1917
 Kent, Ballad (J.H. Barnes, etc.), London: Francis, Day & Hunter, 1912
 The Vow, song for baritone

Choral Songs
 The Cuckoo, choral song, pub. in the Midland Musical Journal, 1885

Piano
Three Sketches, London: Willcocks & Co., 1893
Graceful Dance, London: Willcocks & Co., 1900
Fantastic Dance, London: Cary & Co., 1903

Organ
The Organist's Library of Original Pieces for Organ, Harmonium or American Organ', Book 6. London: Cary & Co., 1898
1.March in D2. Prayer3. Meditation4. Pastorale5. Adagio in A6. Rêverie7. Theme in A8. Melody9. Minuet & Trio10. Andante in F11. PostludeGrand March, pub. in The Organist September 1902, The Lorenz Publishing Co., Dayton, OhioThe Organist's Library of Original Pieces for Organ, Harmonium or American Organ, Book 8. London: Cary & Co., 1903
1. Processional March2. Meditation3. Rest4. Recessional March5. Melody6. Contemplation7. Festal March8. Interlude9. Pastorale10. Minuet11. PostludeOrchestralBallet, "Pluto and Persephone", unpublished ms. (1921). Performed at the Bournemouth Winter Gardens.

Writings

Books
 "Hermaia: a Study in Comparative Esthetics", London: J. M. Dent & Sons, 1915. Many reprints including 

Articles
 "Germany: Her Music" The Musical Times, Vol. 57, No. 882. (1 August 1916), pp. 363–364
 "Britain: Her Music" The Musical Times, Vol. 57, No. 884. (1 October 1916), pp. 445–447
 "Carlyle and the Opera" The Musical Times, Vol. 58, No. 888. (1 February 1917), pp. 58–60
 "The Reality of the Opera", Part I The Musical Times, Vol. 58, No. 891. (1 May 1917), pp. 201–203
 "The Reality of the Opera", Part II The Musical Times, Vol. 58, No. 892. (1 June 1917), pp. 247–249
 "Musical Criticism" The Musical Times, Vol. 58, No. 895, (1 September 1917), pp. 397–399
 "Musical Appreciation: A Plea for Catholicity" The Musical Quarterly, Vol. 6, No. 3. (July 1920), pp. 403–416, OUP.
 "On Hearing Music" The Musical Quarterly, Vol. 8, No. 3. (July 1922), pp. 419–434, OUP.
 "Is Music the Language of the Emotions?" The Musical Quarterly, Vol. 11, No. 3. (July 1925), pp. 427–443, OUP.
 "Concerning Form in Music" The Musical Quarterly, Vol 15, No. 1 (1929), pp. 55–71, OUP.
 "Musical Modernism: Some Random Reflections" The Musical Quarterly, Vol 16, No. 1 (January 1930), pp. 1–20, New York: G. Schirmer Inc.

Bibliography
 Fisher, David J., Colin McAlpin: his music to 1903. Thesis (M.Mus), University of Sheffield, Dept. of Music, 1989 

Notes

References
 
Elson, Arthur. Modern Composers of Europe L.C. Page & Co., Boston, USA (1904)
Howey, Ann F. and Reimer, Stephen R. A Bibliography of Modern Arthuriana (1500-2000) D. S. Brewer, Cambridge (2006) 
Hubbard, W.L. and H.E. Krehbiel. The American History and Encyclopedia of Music: Operas Part II, Squire-Cooley Co., Toledo, Ohio, USA (1924)

External links
 

Texts to vocal music by Colin McAlpin at the LiederNet Archive
Art UK Painting of Colin McAlpin by Richard Jack in the collection of the Leicester Arts and Museums Service
British Music Society Records - Catalogue
BMS recording ENV001 Choral Music by Leicester Composers: The Cuckoo by Colin McAlpin
BMS Newsletter Vol. 2 No.35 September 1987, Stephen Draper, "Colin McAlpin and The Prince of Peace''"

20th-century classical composers
English opera composers
Male opera composers
People from Leicester
English Romantic composers
British ballet composers
English classical composers
Composers for pipe organ
Composers for piano
1870 births
1942 deaths
People educated at Wellingborough School
Musicians from Leicestershire
English male classical composers
20th-century English composers
20th-century British male musicians
19th-century British male musicians